This is a list of universities and colleges in Barbados:

Universities
Public universities:
University of the West Indies, Cave Hill Campus
Private Universities: 

 American University of Barbados, School of Medicine

The following institutions are all for-profit medical training schools:
American University of Integrative Sciences
Bridgetown International University
Ross University School of Medicine
Victoria University of Barbados

Colleges
Codrington College

Teacher training colleges
Erdiston Teachers' Training College

Community College/Institute of Technology
Barbados Community College
Samuel Jackman Prescod Institute of Technology

Defunct
Washington University of Barbados

See also
Education in Barbados

References

Barbados
Barbados
Universities and colleges